Millham City is a former settlement in Kings County, California. Millham City still appeared on maps as of 1937.

References

Former settlements in Kings County, California
Former populated places in California